The Reckoning is the final novel in the Darkest Powers Trilogy written by  Kelley Armstrong. It was released in the USA April 6, 2010. It is the last in the series. The next trilogy follows a new set of teenagers however Kelley has confirmed Chloe and the others will show up.

Plot summary
Following on from the events in The Awakening, the story follows Chloe, Derek, Simon and Tori as they live in the Safe House, formally owned by an ex-employee of the Edison Group, with Simon and Derek's father's friend Andrew. Amongst other visiting supernaturals, the four find themselves racing to try to persuade the renegade group of supernaturals to save Chloe's aunt, who may possibly be dead, and Rae, a former member of Lyle house.

The Reckoning is the final book in the Darkest Powers trilogy. Chloe, Derek, Simon and Tori have made it to safety from the Edison group or so they think. After being on the run and having to rely on themselves in life-threatening scenarios, our supernatural gang is back under the ruling of adults. Adjusting back to the way of a childhood seems to be easier said than done. Chloe and her group of souped up supernatural buddies are still finding their way as their extraordinary powers keep on developing and surpassing all the adult supernaturals around them. With so much power at their hands, this seems to scare even the best of people. Not before long does safety fly out the window and let in a whole new hot mess of problems. Chloe, Derek, Simon and Tori find themselves in all kinds of mishaps that seem be too much to blame on just pure bad luck. This leads them to think there's an Edison Group spy amongst them just waiting to help bring them back to their crazy scientist lab to poke and prod at them, and maybe even worse, to kill them.

All the supernatural drama doesn't stop the mounting attraction between the love triangle between Chloe, Derek and Simon. The chemistry between Derek and Chloe is obvious to everyone but them - they're both inexplicably still blind to it. Simon is still in love with Chloe, whom he eventually shows his feelings for. In the end, they go on a "date" which turns out rather poorly. Simon, having never been hurt by a girl before, is unsure how to react and Chloe feels bad for all of this.

But when Chloe, Simon, and Tori are handed over to the Edison group by one of the supernatural adults, it proves their suspicions of an Edison spy that killed Andrew and Gwen. Simon and Derek's Father comes on time with Derek to save them. During the fight Dr. Davidoff and Tori's mother are killed and the building of the Edison Group was destroyed. Still on the run, they are able to reconcile with each other including the aunt of Chloe and excluding Rae who 'disappeared' before Chloe, Simon, and Tori were handed over. In the end, Chloe and Derek get together.  

2010 Canadian novels
Canadian horror novels
Paranormal romance novels
Novels by Kelley Armstrong
HarperCollins books
American fantasy novels